Kothapeta is a village in Konaseema district of the Indian state of Andhra Pradesh.

Geography 
It has an average elevation of 1 metres (6 ft).

Governance
The civic body of Kothapeta is going to be upgraded as municipal council.

Transport

Kothapeta is located on SH 40(Rajamahendravaram-Amalapuram road). The nearest major railway stations to Kothapeta are Rajahmundry railway station and Tanuku railway station. The nearest airport to Kothapeta is Rajahmundry Airport which is 50 km away.

References 

Villages in Konaseema district
Mandal headquarters in Konaseema district